Apostolepis dimidiata, the common bilineate blackhead, is a species of snake in the family Colubridae. It is found in Brazil, Argentina, and Paraguay.

References 

dimidiata
Reptiles described in 1862
Reptiles of Brazil
Reptiles of Argentina
Reptiles of Paraguay
Taxa named by Giorgio Jan